Jaromír Drábek (born 5 March 1965 in Jablonec nad Nisou) is a Czech politician, who served as the Minister of Labour and Social Affairs from July 2010 to October 2012. He was also the Deputy Leader of the TOP 09.

Drábek studied engineering cybernetics at the Czech Technical University in Prague. Since graduation he worked in the Research Institute of Energetics (1988-1993). After that he began working in the Economic Chamber of Czech Republic and in years 2002 - 2008 he was the president of the Economic Chamber.

In 2009, Drábek entered the new political party TOP 09 and he was the leader of TOP 09 for the Legislative Election 2010 in Ústí nad Labem Region.

References

External links
 Official website 
 Official CV

1965 births
Labour and Social Affairs ministers of the Czech Republic
People from Jablonec nad Nisou
Living people
TOP 09 MPs
Czech Technical University in Prague alumni
Members of the Chamber of Deputies of the Czech Republic (2010–2013)
TOP 09 Government ministers